The internal measurement refers to the quantum measurement realized by the endo-observer. Quantum measurement represents the action of a measuring device on the measured system. When the measuring device is a part of measured system, the measurement proceeds internally in relation to the whole system. This theory was introduced by Koichiro Matsuno and developed by Yukio-Pegio Gunji. They further expanded the original ideas of Robert Rosen and Howard Pattee on the quantum measurement in living systems viewed as natural internal observers that belong to the same scale of the observed objects. According to Matsuno, the internal measurement is accompanied by the redistribution of probabilities that leave them entangled in accordance with the many-worlds interpretation of quantum mechanics by Everett. However, this form of quantum entanglement does not survive in the external measurement in which the mapping to real numbers takes place and the result is revealed in the classical time-space as the Copenhagen interpretation suggests. This means that the internal measurement concept unifies the alternative interpretations of quantum mechanics.

Internal measurement and theoretical biology 
The concept of internal measurement is important for theoretical biology as living organisms can be regarded as endo-observers having their internal self-referential encoding. The internal measurement leads to an iterative recursive process which appears as the development and evolution of the system where any solution is destined to be relative. The evolutionary increase of complexity becomes possible when the genotype emerges as a system distinct from the phenotype and embedded into it, which separates energy-degenerate rate-independent genetic symbols from the rate-dependent dynamics of construction that they control. Evolution in this concept, which is related to autopoiesis, becomes its own cause, a universal property of our world.

Internal measurement and the problem of self 
The self can be attributed to the internal quantum state with entangled probabilities. This entanglement can be held for prolonged times in the systems with low dissipation without demolition. According to Matsuno, organisms exploit thermodynamic gradients by acting as heat engines to drastically reduce the effective temperature within macromolecular complexes which can potentially provide the maintenance of long-living coherent states in the microtubules of nervous system.  The concept of internal measurement develops the ideas of Schrödinger who suggested in "What is life?" that the nature of the self is quantum mechanical, i.e. the self is attributed to an internal state beyond quantum reduction, which generates emergent events by applying quantum reduction externally and observing it.

See also
Endophysics
Interpretations of quantum mechanics
Autopoiesis

References

Philosophical theories
Measurement